The Barque of Dante is an oil on canvas painting by Édouard Manet, after The Barque of Dante by Eugène Delacroix, executed between 1854 and 1858. It is now in the Museum of Fine Arts of Lyon.

The painting depicts events from canto eight of Dante Alighieri's Inferno, in which Dante is escorted across the River Styx by his guide, the classical poet Virgil. The City of the Dead burns in the background.

A second version of the subject, c. 1853, is held by the Metropolitan Museum of Art in New York City.

References

1858 paintings
Paintings by Édouard Manet
Paintings in the collection of the Museum of Fine Arts of Lyon
Paintings based on works by Dante Alighieri
Hell in popular culture
Cultural depictions of Dante Alighieri
Cultural depictions of Virgil
Maritime paintings
Works based on Inferno (Dante)